Paudie Feehan is an Irish hurler and footballer who plays as a forward for the Tipperary senior team. He plays his club hurling with Killenaule.

Career
Feehan made his senior debut for the Tipperary hurling team on 3 February 2018 in the second round of the 2018 National Hurling League against Waterford. He came into the team a few minutes before the start due to Cathal Barrett picking up a groin injury.

On 22 November 2020, Feehan was a substitute as Tipperary won the 2020 Munster Senior Football Championship after a 0-17 to 0-14 win against Cork in the final. It was Tipperary's first Munster title in 85 years.

Honours

All-Ireland Under-21 Hurling Championship (1): 2018
Munster Senior Football Championship (1): 2020

References

Living people
Killenaule hurlers
Tipperary inter-county hurlers
Year of birth missing (living people)